Tom Cronin is a hurler who, as of 2008, was playing with Kerry and Crotta O'Neill's.

References

Kerry inter-county hurlers
Crotta O'Neill's hurlers
Year of birth missing (living people)
Living people
Place of birth missing (living people)